Princess Yicheng was a Chinese princess of the Sui dynasty and a khatun of the Eastern Turkic Khaganate. She spent at least 30 years of her life among the Turks.

Family 
She was an extended family member of Sui Dynasty. Her father was named Yang Xie (杨谐) and her brother was Yang Shanjing (杨善经).

Life as khatun

With Yami Qaghan 
After death of Princess Anyi (安义公主) in 599, she was created a princess by Emperor Wen of Sui and wed to Yami Qaghan in heqin.

With Shibi Qaghan 
She was inherited by his step-son Shibi Qaghan in 609, in a levirate marriage. She had much influence on khagan, to the point of changing his orders. In the fall of 615, when Emperor Yang of Sui was visiting Yanmen Commandery on the northern frontier, the khagan launched a surprise attack on the area, overrunning most of its Chinese settlements. Warned by the khagan's wife Princess Yicheng — a member of the imperial family who had been well treated by Empress Xiao during an earlier visit — the emperor, empress, and their entourage escaped to the commandery seat at present-day Daixian. The Turks besieged them there on September 11. Resources in seat was small. Emperor was reported to cry out of fear seeing  Yuwen suggested Emperor Yang select a few thousand elite cavalry soldiers to attempt a break out, but Su Wei and Fan Zigai (樊子蓋) persuaded Emperor Yang not to attempt this. Emperor Yang put Xiao Yu and Pei Ju in charge of planning the military counteroffensive, but was only able to get the siege lifted after he followed the advice of the empress's brother Xiao Yu and sent messengers to Princess Yicheng, who was directing military affairs at the Turkic capital in her husband's absence. She falsely informed Shibi Khagan that the Turks were under attack from the north, and so the khagan lifted the siege.

With Chuluo Qaghan 
She was inherited by Chuluo Qaghan in 619, another step-son from her first marriage. Yicheng greeted Empress Xiao and Yang Zhengdao, a posthumous son of Yang Jian who was created as puppet King of Sui (隋國王) by Chuluo. This marriage was brief. After Chuluo's death in June, she refused to marry Ashina Momo (阿史那摸末, 607 - 649 was titled Yushe shad (郁射設) and eventually married to someone of Imperial Li (李) clan), claiming he was weak. Instead, married to Ashina Duobi, who was created Illig Qaghan.

With Illig Qaghan 
After refusing Yushe Shad, she finally wed to Illig Qaghan in 620, yet another step-son. She was killed in confusion when Tang general Li Jing attacked the khagan's encampment with Li Shiji in 630, Battle of Yinshan.

In Popular Media 
She was portrayed by Li Xia (李霞) in the 1993 Taiwanese costume drama "Tang Taizong - Li Shimin" (唐太宗李世民). Princess Yicheng is a character in Bakhtiyar Vahabzadeh's "Göytürklər" (Gokturks) play. In the Chinese drama, The Long Ballad (长歌行), she is an antagonist.

References 

Chinese princesses
Sui dynasty
Transition from Sui to Tang
Göktürks
Year of birth unknown
630 deaths